Angel Aguilar (born May 8, 1974), better known by his stage names Agallah, 8-Off, Brad Piff, Swagallah and Agallah Don Bishop, is an American rapper and producer. He was a member of The Diplomats-affiliated group Purple City and he is the CEO of his label Propain Campain. He was formerly known as 8-Off Agallah.

He has ghostwritten songs for many well-known artists. In addition to producing his own music, he also produced tracks for Busta Rhymes, Remy Ma, The Diplomats, Guru, Rockin' Squat, Sean Price, Saigon, Game Theory, PMD, Das Efx, Mobb Deep and Big Pun. In 1995, he finished his debut album, Wrap Your Lips Around This, but it was never properly released because the album was shelved. In 2012, Wrap Your Lips Around This became available for digital download from Amazon.com  and iTunes after being unreleased for many years.

History
Agallah was born and raised in the Brownsville area of the Brooklyn borough of New York City, New York. Agallah started out as a producer, then turned to rhyming and released a major-label single on East West America/Elektra Records in 1995. In 1997, he featured on  R.A. the Rugged Man's track "Till My Heart Stops" on the Rawkus Records Soundbombing compilation an underground classic. A collaboration with Mr. Cheeks of the Lost Boyz followed, although the album the single was to appear on, Wrap Your Lips Around This, was never released.  Additionally, there were production stints for the likes of EPMD, Das EFX, Onyx, and Group Home.  In 2000, Agallah recorded the Sesame Street-themed single "Crookie Monster," which became an underground hit, and featured production by The Alchemist.

In early 1997, Agallah teamed up with EPMD member PMD and formed the hip hop group D.B.D. (Death B4 Dishonor). The other members of the group were Ike Eyes, 215 and Deke O'Malley. The group was short-lived but they recorded a demo album which featured artist Guru of Gang Starr, John Forté, Special Ed, and Lil Dap of Group Home. D.B.D. also released a single entitled "Feel This" which was produced by KRS-One's brother Kenny Parker.

A friendship with Shiest Bub led to the formation of Purple City Entertainment (also known as Purple City Productions) with Un Kasa, which attracted the attention of Dipset capo Jim Jones.  Shiest had been doing promotional work for Cam'ron and Juelz Santana.  For the new Purple City project, Agallah was christened "the Don Bishop", with Shiest as "the Emperor."  Jones' enthusiasm for Ag's track "Gangsta" garnered the producer/MC a slot on the Diplomats Volume 4 mixtape.

Purple City signed to Babygrande Records in late 2004.  The following year, the label released a "greatest hits" collection that culled tracks from their mixtapes.

Agallah's profile as a solo artist has also expanded in the wake of Purple City's rise, with the release of You Already Know (featuring appearances by Dead Prez and Nappy Roots, with production by DJ Premier and Alchemist) on Babygrande coupled with the release of the mixtape Propane Piff on Koch Records.

His song "Risin' to the Top" appeared in the Rockstar Games' Grand Theft Auto III video game, on the Game Radio FM radio station. Agallah later teamed up with Rockstar Games to record the soundtrack for Midnight Club 2. Agallah's beats are also in the EA Sports basketball game NBA Live 08 and UFC Undisputed.

In mid-2007, Agallah stated in a MySpace bulletin that he was no longer signed to Babygrande.

In 2012, Agallah featured on rapper/producer Danny!'s seventh studio album Payback.  Agallah can be seen featured in a number of videos with fellow Propain Campaign member PopOff, including the "Make It Out" video.  One of a number of PopOff music videos produced by Vertex Media, a Hollywood-based film production company.

Discography

Solo albums 
 Wrap Your Lips Around This (November 21, 1995, EastWest) (as 8-Off)
 You Already Know (2006, Babygrande)
 Agalito's Way (2015, Propain Campain)
 Bo: The Legend of the Water Dragon (2016, Propain Campain)
 Agnum Opus (2017, The Order Label)
 Ag Al Ghul - No Mercy For The Weak (2018, The Order Label)
 Live At Your Own Risk (2019, Propain Compain)
 Fuck You: The Album - (2020, Propain Campain)
 Francisco Blanco (2021)
 Agstalgia (2021)
 2021 (2021, Propain Campain)
 High Level Art (2021)
 High Level Art 2 - Blakeside Galleria (2021, Propain Campain)
 The Year Of The Tiger (2022, Propain Campain)

EPs and mixtapes 
 Da Mixtape Iz da Album (2001)
 Show Up (2002) (as 8-Off Agallah)
 Doomsday (2004)
 Propane Piff (2006, Babygrande/Koch)
 Cakemix (2006, Propain Campain)
 Fuck a Purple Chain (2007)
 F.A.M.E. (2008, Propain Campain)
 Agobama The President (2008)
 '09 Is Mines (2009, Propain Campain)
 Forever Fire The EP (2012, Propain Campain)
 Agallah Presents Propain Campain Mixtape (2012, Propain Campain)
 The Red V (2013, Propain Campain)
 Propain Campain Presents Agallah The Instrumentals Vol.1 (2014, Propain Campain)
 The Life of Don Francis (Prelude To Agalito's Way) (2014, Propain Campain)
 Past and Present (2014, Propain Campain) (with The Alchemist)
 Don Status (2015, Propain Campain)
 Flight of the Cranes (2015, self-released) (with DirtyDiggs)
 3-Day Theory (2017, The Order Label) (with Duke WestLake)
 Aggravated (2020, self-released)
 Black Anarchy Music (2020, Propain Campain)
 Darona (2020, Propain Campain)
 Darona 2 (2020, Propain Campain)
 2021 (2021, self-released)

Singles 
 "Ghetto Girl" (1995, EastWest) (as 8-Off)
 "Alize for Dolo" (1996, EastWest) (as 8-Off)
 "Crookie Monster" (1999, Game)
 "Rising to the Top" (featuring Sean Price) (2002, Game) (as 8-Off Agallah)
 "Imagine Your Life" (featuring Monie Love) (2002, Street Level) (as 8-Off Agallah)
 "New York Ryder Music" (2006, Babygrande)
 "Club Hoppin'" (2006, Babygrande)
 "Coat of Arms" (featuring Planet Asia, Rasco & Tristate) (2013, Propain Campain)
"Slavery" (2016, Propain Campain)
Blood sweat and Tears By Knowledge Born featuring Agallah

References

External links
 

American hip hop record producers
Living people
Musicians from Brooklyn
Rappers from Brooklyn
Underground rappers
1974 births
21st-century American rappers
Record producers from New York (state)
People from Brownsville, Brooklyn
East West Records artists